The Cage is the first album by guitarist Dario Mollo and former Black Sabbath vocalist Tony Martin.

Track listing

Personnel
Band Members
Tony Martin – vocals
Dario Mollo – lead guitar
Fulvio Gaslini – bass
Ezio Secomandi – drums
Don Airey – keyboards
Elio Maugeri – backing vocals

Production
Kit Woolven – production
Dario Mollo – production, cover art

References

Tony Martin (British singer) albums
Dario Mollo albums
1998 debut albums
Collaborative albums